Louisa Lynthia Mark, also known as "Markswoman" (11 January 1960 – 17 October 2009), was a British lovers rock singer, best known for her work between the mid-1970s and early 1980s. Her 1975 single "Caught You in a Lie" is regarded as the first lovers rock single.

Biography
Mark was born in Kensal Rise, London to Grenadian immigrant parents, and grew up in Shepherd's Bush.  She had her introduction to the music business initially by working as guest vocalist on Dennis Bovell's Sufferer sound system, followed by a residency at the Metro club in Westbourne Park, and via "Star Search" talent contests held at the Four Aces club in Dalston, where she won for ten consecutive weeks. Sound-system operator and record producer Lloyd Coxsone provided dub plates for the contestants to sing over at the contests and, in late 1974, provided the fifteen-year-old Mark with her first recording session, at Gooseberry Studios, where she recorded a cover version of Robert Parker's "Caught You in a Lie", on which she was backed by Matumbi, the single also being released in Jamaica by Gussie Clarke. "Caught You in a Lie" is considered the first lovers rock single. It gave her an instant hit with reggae audiences, and was followed by a version of The Beatles' "All My Loving". Her career was interrupted after a dispute with Coxsone and she concentrated on finishing her studies.

After leaving school, Mark resumed her musical career working with Trojan Records house producer and A&R manager Clement Bushay, and songwriter/arranger Joseph "Tunga" Charles (of Zabandis), releasing "Keep it Like It Is". She stayed with Bushay for further releases on his own Bushays label including her rendition of Michael Jackson's "Even Though You're Gone", "Six Sixth Street", and her début album Breakout (1981). She was unhappy with the album, feeling that it had been released before it had been properly finished, and did not record again for over a year. Mark returned to the studio in 1982, recording "Mum and Dad" (arranged by Sly & Robbie).

Mark was voted Artist of The Year in the 1978 Reggae Awards (UK).

Death
On the 18 October 2009 edition of his BBC London radio show, Dotun Adebayo reported that Mark had died of poisoning in Gambia, where she had been residing.

On 20 October 2009, Trojan Records confirmed the story, stating cause of death was a stomach ulcer.

Discography

Albums
Breakout (1981), Bushays

Singles
"Caught You in a Lie" (1975), Safari - 7"
"All My Loving" (1975), Safari - 7"
"Even Though You're Gone" (1978), Bushays - 12"
"Six Sixth Street" (1978), Bushays
"Caught You in a Lie" (1979), Voyage International - 12", B-side by Clinton Grant
"People in Love" (1980), Radic - 12"
"All My Loving (1984), Voyage International - 7"
"Caught You in a Lie" (1984), Code - 12"
"Hello There" (1984), Oak Sound - 12", Louisa Mark & Zabandis
"Mum and Dad" (1982), Bushays, 12"
"Keep It Like It Is" (1986), Trojan - 7"/12"
"Reunited" b/w "Reunited Stepping Out" with Kevin & The Bushrangers, Bushays, BFM 113, 12"
"Foolish Fool", Sky Note, 12"

References

1960 births
2009 deaths
People from Kensal Green
Lovers rock musicians
20th-century Black British women singers
British reggae musicians